A boating lake is a lake used for recreational boating.

Such lakes are often in parks and can be artificially made. Some boating lakes are used for model boats.

References

External links

 

 
Lakes by type
Lakes